Colour fastness is a term—used in the dyeing of textile materials—that characterizes a material's colour's resistance to fading or running. Colour fastness is the property of dyes and it is directly proportional to the binding force between photochromic dye and the fibre. The colour fastness may also be affected by processing techniques and choice of chemicals and axillaries.

The term is usually used in the context of clothes. In general, clothing should be tested for colour fastness before using bleach or other cleaning products.

Light fastness, wash fastness, and rub fastness are the main forms of colour fastness that are standardized. The light fastness of textile dye is categorized from one to eight and the wash fastness from one to five, with a higher the number indicating better fastness.

Dye and the binding forces 
A dye is a colored substance that chemically bonds to the substrate to which it is being applied. Dyes are classified according to their solubility and chemical properties. Dyes are selected according to the affinity,  any given dye does not apply to every type of fiber. The different binding forces acts between the dye and substrate. Such as Van der Waals forces include attraction and repulsions between atoms, molecules, and surfaces, as well as other intermolecular forces. Example is Direct dyes application to cotton that results poor fastness properties to washing. The bond differs from covalent bonding in reactive dyes when applied to cotton that may result far better fastness than direct dyes. Covalent bond is a stronger bond, caused by correlations in the fluctuating polarizations of nearby particles (a consequence of quantum dynamics).

Pigments as an exception do not bind chemically with textile materials.

Importance of colour fastness 
Colour is an influential element of fashion and aesthetics of clothing, it has great value for both the user and the brand. Colour is one of the most significant features in attracting customers and inclines to buy a product/garment. Retaining the original colour is one of the important quality parameter of coloured textiles. Colour fastness is rated poor if it does not comply with the tests by exposing to laundry, light,  rubbing and other agencies such as perspiration.

Test methods for colour fastness 
Fading, change in colour, staining to adjacent textiles material were common complaint of poor textile quality materials. Standardized testing for colourfastness and other parameters was established in the 20th century by industrialized economies such as the US, the UK, Japan, and Europe. AATCC, International Organization for Standardization and Society of Dyers and Colourists played vital role in establishing the test methods.

There are various tests and testing methods according to the physical and functional requirements from the product. For example fastness to saliva may be important for kids-wear and perspiration and light is important for a golf shirt. European and US retailers use ISO and AATCC standards respectively.

References

External links
 AATCC Test Methods - Textile Testing Research and Development
 

Textiles
Properties of textiles